Click is a Canadian instructional television series which aired on CBC Television in 1962.

Premise
This Toronto-produced series featured information on various aspects of amateur photography and filmmaking with demonstrations of the various materials, methods and devices used. Occasional location segments were recorded at laboratories in specialties such as science and forensics.

Scheduling
This 15-minute series was broadcast on Thursdays at 6:30 p.m. (North American Eastern time) from 5 July to 27 September 1962.

References

External links
 

CBC Television original programming
1962 Canadian television series debuts
1962 Canadian television series endings